Špela Kern (born 24 February 1990) is a Slovenian racing cyclist, who rides for UCI Women's Continental Team . She has competed in the women's road race at the UCI Road World Championships seven times between 2013, and 2022.

Major results
Source: 

2013
 National Road Championships
2nd Road race
4th Time trial
2014
 National Road Championships
3rd Road race
5th Time trial
 5th Giro dell'Emilia Internazionale Donne Elite
2015
 3rd Road race, National Road Championships
 7th Open de Suède Vårgårda TTT
2016
 National Road Championships
3rd Road race
4th Time trial
2017
 2nd Road race, National Road Championships
2018
 National Road Championships
3rd Road race
5th Time trial
 6th Road race, Mediterranean Games
2019
 4th Time trial, National Road Championships
2020
 2nd Road race, National Road Championships
2021
 3rd Road race, National Road Championships
 7th Overall Setmana Ciclista Valenciana
 9th Overall Tour Cycliste Féminin International de l'Ardèche
2022
 2nd Road race, National Road Championships
 6th Alpes Gresivaudan Classic 
 10th Mont Ventoux Dénivelé Challenge

References

External links
 

1990 births
Living people
Slovenian female cyclists
Place of birth missing (living people)